Announced by Sony on August 24, 2011, and launched alongside its brother the Sony Alpha 77, the Sony Alpha 65 is the top-tier for Sony's midrange Alpha SLT camera line.

The Sony Alpha 65 does not have a direct predecessor like the Sony Alpha 77 however is still considered a replacement for the Sony Alpha 700 with less high-end specifications than its brother. The A65 lacks the A77's magnesium alloy construction in favor of a polycarbonate resin (plastic) resulting in a lighter frame and slightly smaller dimensions and lacking weather-proofing capability. The A65 uses the USB 2.0 transfer interface of 480 Mbit/s, has HDMI type C for connectivity and remote capabilities using the RM-S1 accessory.

The camera enters the market with its own tier entry into the range, boasting features such as a 24.3Mpx APS-C HD CMOS sensor using a single-lens translucent mirror and features full HD 1080p recording capabilities using H.264 compression. It hosts a variable burst-shooting mode up to 10fps, stereo audio recording capabilities and like others in the Sony Alpha range it has high sensitivity with ISO 100 to 16000, several noise reduction features, 8 white balance presets including custom balance and exposure control systems. The battery capacity is rated for 510 shots using the electronic viewfinder or 560 shots using the LCD. The capture format for images in raw format uses the .ARW extension, Sony's extension for raw.

The rear panel has the same layout as the Sony Alpha 55 and whilst the LCD hosts a 4:3 aspect ratio compared to the A55's 16:9 it has the same resolution and adjustability. With a few minor layout changes one easily noted oddity is the reversal direction of the power switch compared with the A55 believed to result in an easier operation.

Model variants
Model variants of the Alpha 65 camera body: 
 SLT-A65V with GPS.
 SLT-A65 without GPS (depending on country).
Depending on country/market, the Alpha 65 camera  is also available in different kits: 
 SLT-A65VK (A65V+ 18–55 mm lens).
 SLT-A65VL (A65V+ 18–55 mm MK2 lens).
 SLT-A65VM (A65V+ 18–135 mm lens).

Features

Image features
 23.5 x 15.6mm Exmor APS-C HD CMOS sensor.
 24.3 Mpx (effective), 24.7 Mpx (total) image size.
 Updated BIONZ Image Processor.
 2nd generation Translucent Mirror Technology.
 Multi-frame Noise Reduction.
 Native 3:2 and 16:9 aspect ratios.
 1.4x and 2x digital zoom.

Focus system
 TTL phase-detection AF.
 15-point autofocus sensors with 3 cross type sensors.
 -1 to 18 exposure value focus sensitivity range (ISO 100 equivalent with F2.8 lens attachment).
 Continuous (AF-C), single (AF-S), auto (AF-A) and manual (MF) focus options.
 Object tracking and micro adjustment AF with focus lock.

Exposure and metering
 1200 Zone exposure metering.
 -2 to 17 exposure value metering sensitivity range (ISO 100 equivalent with F1.4 lens attachment).
 Multi segment, center weighted and spot metering.
 ±3.0 exposure value compensation (1/3 EV steps).
 ISO 100 to 16,000 (25,600 with multi-image combination).

Shutter
 24.3Mpx burst mode continuous shooting, Hi: 8fps and Lo: 3fps.
 1/4000 to 30s (and Bulb) shutter speed range. 
 Shutter rated for 100,000 actuations.

LCD monitor and viewfinder
 .5in (13mm) TruFinder XGA OLED electronic viewfinder with 2,359,296 dots resolution with 1.09x magnification and full 100% frame coverage.
 3in (76.2mm) TruBlack XtraFine LCD screen with 921,600 dots resolution with pull-out three-hinge tilt/swivel functionality and full 100% frame coverage.
 Adjustable LCD angle: Downward 180°, rotation angle: Leftward 270° from the position in which the LCD monitor is facing forward.
 Histogram display, graphic display, digital level gauge, shooting data display, simple display, grid line and shooting information for viewfinder display options.
 5.9x and 11.7x focus magnification.
 Live View with full-time Phase Detection AF.

Ergonomics and functions
 Dual anti-dust sensor cleaning system.
 SteadyShot INSIDE, in-body image stabilization system.
 D-Range Optimiser (5 levels and Auto).
 Stereo microphone and external mic socket.
 Built in GPS (SLT-A65V model only).
 3D Sweep Panorama.

Video
 AVCHD 2.0 Full 1080p HD recording at 60p/28Mbit/s/(PS), 60i/24Mbit/s/(FX), 60i/17Mbit/s/(FH), 24p/24Mbit/s/(FX) or 24p/17Mbit/s/(bpsFH).
 MPEG-4 recording at 1440 x 1080 (30fps/12Mbit/s) and VGA 640 x 480 (30fps/3Mbit/s).
 MPEG-4 AVC (H.264) video compression.
 Dolby Digital (AC-3) and MPEG-4 AAC-LC audio recording formats.

Firmware updates
On 5 February 2013, Sony released a new firmware V1.07, with the following enhancements:
 Added support for Sony Alpha Lenses (with  automatic compensation compliancy):
 SAL-100M28, SAL-50M28, SAL-85F28, SAL-18200, SAL-20F28 and SAL-28F28.

References 

Cameras introduced in 2011
65
Live-preview digital cameras